The Illhøllia Tunnel (sometimes spelled Ildhøllia) is a  long tunnel on European route E06 in the Dunderland Valley in the municipality of Rana in Nordland county, Norway. The tunnel was opened in 2002. The tunnel is located in an area with very steep mountains along the Ranelva river. Before the opening of the tunnel, European route E06 had to be continuously repaired because the road was about to collapse into the river due to erosion from the small brooks flowing down the mountains and going beneath the road.

References

Road tunnels in Nordland
2002 establishments in Norway
Tunnels completed in 2002
Rana, Norway
Roads within the Arctic Circle